The 2005 Red Bull Air Race World Series was the third Red Bull Air Race World Series season. It began on April 8, 2005 and ended on October 8.

In the 2005 season, the RAF Kemble in the United Kingdom was replaced by Longleat and Reno, Nevada in the United States with San Francisco, California. The number of race locations grew from three  to seven by adding Abu Dhabi in the United Arab Emirates, Rotterdam in the Netherlands, Zeltweg in Austria and Rock of Cashel in Ireland.

The previous year's competitors from the USA, Michael Goulian and Martin David, did not participate in the 2005 season. British Nigel Lamb joined the Red Bull Air Race from the Longleat leg onwards. American pilot Mike Mangold, won five of the seven races, became champion in 2005 with a total of 36 points followed by Hungarian Péter Besenyei (32 points). Kirby Chambliss from the United States, ranked on third place with 21 points.

Race calendar

Standings and results

Legend:
 DNP: Did not participate
 DNS: Did not show
 TP: Technical problems

Aircraft

External links

 Details of 2005 Air Races

Red Bull Air Race World Championship seasons
Red Bull Air Race World Series
Red Bull Air Race World Series